Baulk may refer to:

 , areas on various types of billiard table
 , a wall of intact earth in an archaeological excavation
 Baulk road, a type of railway track
 Baulking
 Baulking, tactic used in water polo to trick a goalkeeper into thinking that the player is shooting
 Baulking, a village in Oxfordshire England
 Baulk Head to Mullion, a coastal site of Special Scientific Interest (SSSI) in Cornwall, England

See also
 Balk (disambiguation)